Coal Creek, commonly known as Coal Creek Canyon, is a census-designated place (CDP) located in and governed by Jefferson, Boulder, and Gilpin counties in Colorado, United States, but primarily Jefferson County. The population of the Coal Creek CDP was 2,400 at the United States Census 2010. The Golden post office (Zip code 80403) serves the area.

Geography

Climate
According to the Köppen Climate Classification system, Coal Creek has a warm-summer humid continental climate, abbreviated "BSk" on climate maps, but closely borders on an oceanic climate (Cfb).

Demographics

See also

 List of census-designated places in Colorado

References

External links

 Coal Creek Canyon @ UncoverColorado.com
 Coal Creek Canyon Improvement Association
 Canyon Cares of Coal Creek Canyon
 Coal Creek Canyon Fire Protection District
 Coal Creek Canyon Park and Recreation District
 Coal Creek Canyon Mountain Messenger

Census-designated places in Jefferson County, Colorado
Census-designated places in Boulder County, Colorado
Census-designated places in Gilpin County, Colorado
Census-designated places in Colorado
Denver metropolitan area